Love To Sew is a Canadian sewing podcast hosted by Helen Wilkinson and Caroline Somos focused on handmade clothing.  In 2019, Love To Sew was included on Simply Sewing'''s list of best sewing podcasts.

 Description 
Based in Vancouver, British Columbia the podcast launched in August 2017 as a way to address a lack of sewing related podcast options.

The weekly episodes include interviews with sewers, pattern designers or small business owners, along with discussions and advice about sewing techniques, pattern adjustments, fabric choices, sewing machines, and notions. Guests on the show have included former The Great British Sewing Bee contestant Tilly Walnes, actress Jasika Nicole, author Gretchen Rubin and independent designer Jen Beeman. The hosts, who met on Instagram, both run small sewing related businesses in Vancouver. Wilkinson is the operator for pattern company Helen's Closet Patterns and Samos runs the online fabric store Blackbird Fabrics. In 2019, Love To Sew was included on Simply Sewing'''s list of best sewing podcasts which highlighted the show's discussions about pattern hacking and sewing swimwear as part of the Sewing Skills series.

References

External links

Audio podcasts
2017 podcast debuts
Interview podcasts
Canadian podcasts